Fury Gene Tenace (born Fiore Gino Tenacci; October 10, 1946), better known as Gene Tenace, is an American former professional baseball player and coach. He played as a catcher and first baseman in Major League Baseball from  through , most notably as a member of the Oakland Athletics dynasty that won three consecutive World Series championships between 1972 and 1974.

Tenace was drafted by the Kansas City Athletics from Valley High School in Lucasville, Ohio and played for the Oakland Athletics, San Diego Padres, St. Louis Cardinals and the Pittsburgh Pirates. He batted and threw right-handed. Tenace was one of the top catchers of his era and won the 1972 World Series Most Valuable Player Award. Gene Tenace was one of the greatest hitting catchers of all time despite his low career batting average of .241, with his career 140 WRC+ being tied with Mike Piazza for the highest all-time among catchers; he made up for his low average with a very high on-base percentage of .388 while playing in a weak offensive era, which is tied with Joe Mauer for the third highest all-time among qualifying catchers, and with a .429 slugging percentage that was considerably above the average in the era he played. With his 46.8 Baseball Reference Wins Above Replacement (WAR), he is 13th all-time among catchers, and his 7-year peak WAR is tied with Roy Campanella for 12th all-time among catchers. Also of note is that his career rWAR is fifth highest among all sub .250 hitters.

After his playing days ended, Tenace coached for several organizations, most notably for the Toronto Blue Jays.

Playing career

Oakland Athletics (1969–76)
Tenace was selected in baseball's first entry draft, being taken in the 20th round of the 1965 Major League Baseball draft by the then Kansas City Athletics. Tenace made his major league debut for Oakland on May 29, 1969 against the Detroit Tigers at Oakland–Alameda County Coliseum where he went 0-for-4 with two strikeouts in an 8–4 Oakland loss. He hit the first home run of his career on June 6, 1969 at Tiger Stadium against Earl Wilson of the Detroit Tigers. He finished the  season with a .158 batting average, a home run and two runs batted in, appearing in just 38 games as a third-string catcher.

He continued to play the next two years as the third-string catcher before serving as Dave Duncan's backup in 1971. Tenace entered the 1972 season backing up Duncan, but was given a chance to show his abilities by being made the team's regular catcher in the post-season. Tenace took full advantage of this opportunity, excelling in the 1972 playoffs and World Series. In the 1972 American League Championship Series against the Detroit Tigers, he drove in the clinching run in Oakland's 2–1 victory in Game 5; it was his only hit of the series.  Tenace's heroics made up for an error in Game 4 of the series when he had to play second base (for the first time since high school) in the late innings due to regular second baseman Dick Green getting hurt and backup second baseman Ted Kubiak having to play shortstop due to Bert Campaneris being suspended.  Tenace dropped a throw from Sal Bando on a potential game-ending double play attempt in the bottom of the 10th which kept the inning alive as the Tigers eventually won.

He put himself in the spotlight once again in Game 1 of the 1972 World Series when the Athletics faced the Cincinnati Reds. He became the first player to hit home runs in his first two World Series at bats and drove in all three runs in the A's 3–2 victory.  Prior to Tenace's feat, only eight other players had homered in their first World Series at bat. In Game 4, the A's were losing 2–1, with their only run to that point coming on Tenace's solo home run. A ninth-inning one-out rally consisting of four singles, with Tenace's the second and the rest coming from pinch hitters, won the game against Cincinnati's ace relief pitcher, Clay Carroll. He hit a three-run home run in the A's Game 5 loss. Before Game 6 of the 1972 Series, he was the target of a death threat. In Game 7, he was once again the hero, driving in two runs in a 3–2 victory for Oakland. In total, he went 8-for-23 in the Series, with four home runs and 9 RBI to earn the World Series Most Valuable Player Award.

Tenace's heroics helped him earn a full-time job in Oakland's lineup. He served as the team's starting first baseman for two seasons, while still serving as the backup catcher to Ray Fosse. As a regular starter for the A's, Tenace had a low batting average but a fair amount of power, hitting 20 home runs in four consecutive years in Oakland, finishing among the top 10 home run hitters in the American League each year. He further made up for his lack of a high batting average by sporting a tremendous batting eye. He drew over 100 walks in a season three times for Oakland, and led the American League in walks in 1974, making up for a career-low .211 average that year. Statistically, his best year with Oakland was in 1975, when he hit a career-best 29 home runs and drove in 87 runs, drew 106 walks, finished 18th in the American League Most Valuable Player Award balloting and was selected to be the starting first baseman for the American League in the 1975 All-Star Game.

As a member of the A's, Tenace hit what turned out to be the final home run in the history of Kansas City's Municipal Stadium on September 30, 1972, in a 10–5 Oakland victory over the Kansas City Royals.

San Diego Padres (1977–80)

Tenace was one of several Athletics who became free agents after the 1976 season and participated in a newly created re-entry draft, in which teams acquired the rights to negotiate with veteran free agents. Tenace and teammate Rollie Fingers were the first players from that draft to sign, with both joining the San Diego Padres in December of that year. In four years as a starter with the Padres, his power numbers dropped in part due to the cavernous dimensions of San Diego Jack Murphy Stadium, only reaching 20 home runs once; but his batting eye remained, recording three more seasons of 100 walks, with a career best of 125 in 1977. In 1979, Tenace led National League catchers with a .998 fielding percentage, committing only one error in 94 games. He recorded an on-base percentage of over .390 in each of his years in San Diego, and finished third in the National League in that department in three consecutive years.

On August 1, 1979, Tenace was part of a bench-clearing brawl against the Atlanta Braves. After hitting a home run off of pitcher Eddie Solomon, he charged the mound when Solomon apparently said something to him, and the benches cleared. No punches were thrown, and the Braves won 5–4.

St. Louis Cardinals (1981–82)
After the 1980 season, Tenace, Fingers, Bob Shirley, and Bob Geren joined the St. Louis Cardinals in a trade for Terry Kennedy and six minor league players. In his two years in St. Louis, Tenace primarily played against left-handed pitchers, platooning with Darrell Porter. As a member of the Cardinals team he won the 1982 World Series, giving him four World Series rings.

Pittsburgh Pirates (1983)
Tenace played his final season as a utility player and pinch-hitter, appearing in 53 games and batting just .177 with 6 RBI for the Pittsburgh Pirates in 1983. He retired after being released the following year in spring training.

Coaching career
Tenace became a coach after retiring as a player. He was touted as a possible managerial candidate during his later years. The Pittsburgh Pirates became strongly interested in the possibility of hiring Tenace as their manager to replace Chuck Tanner. When the year ended, however, Tanner was still the manager, so Tenace became a coach at the Major League level with the Houston Astros in 1986 and 1987, and later coached with the Toronto Blue Jays from 1990 to 1997. When manager Cito Gaston was sidelined with a herniated disc in 1991, Tenace served as the team's interim manager, going 19–14 and keeping Toronto competitive en route to an eventual American League Eastern Division title. He was part of Toronto's World Series-winning teams in 1992 and 1993, giving him six rings in six World Series appearances as a player and a coach. After he left the Jays, he joined the Boston Red Sox organization, serving as hitting coach for their Triple-A affiliate Pawtucket Red Sox in 1999, and Double-A affiliate Trenton Thunder in 2001. He then served as a hitting instructor for the St. Louis Cardinals organization. He was re-hired as the Blue Jays' hitting coach on June 20, 2008, when Cito Gaston replaced John Gibbons as the team's manager. Tenace replaced hitting coach Gary Denbo. He was one of two members of Gaston's old coaching staff from his last World Series championship team who were brought back to the team (third base coach Nick Leyva being the other). He announced his retirement following the 2009 season.

Managerial record

Hitting approach
Tenace advocates a more aggressive approach to hitting. Under his guidance, hitters spend less time working the count and more time preparing to hit. He stresses the mental part of hitting, such as the mental preparation for what a pitcher will do, rather than just the physical aspect. Under Tenace, the philosophy of hitting can be described as "Grip It And Rip It" and more of an old school approach to hitting.

During the 2008 season, prior to the hiring of Gaston, the Blue Jays had a record of 35–39. Once Gaston and his coaches took over the Blue Jays went 51–37 to finish with an 86–76 record. The offensive improvements under Gaston were one of the reasons for the resurgence and as the hitting coach, Tenace was credited with rejuvenating a stagnant offense. Adam Lind commented: "The thing is, a lot of people can teach you how to hit, but not a lot of people can teach you how to hit in the big leagues", referring to the major league experience of Gaston and Tenace. Blue Jays' former center fielder Vernon Wells has said he likes the approach to hitting that Tenace teaches: "One thing Gene talks about is having that approach mentally when you go up there, in your mind you already guarantee yourself that one run on third, but you want to do more than that. Gene always says that first runner is a gimme, you should be able to come through in pretty much every situation like that. And then you try to do more damage than just that one run".

Career statistics
In a 15-year major league career, Tenace played in 1,555 games, accumulating 1,060 hits in 4,390 at bats for a .241 career batting average along with 201 home runs, 674 runs batted in and an on-base percentage of .388. He not only caught nearly 900 games, but also played first base over 600 times. Tenace ended his career with a .986 fielding percentage as a catcher and a .993 fielding percentage as a first baseman. After becoming an everyday player in 1973, he did not have an on-base average below .370 until his final year; his OBP was above .400 five times and over .390 (about 60 points above the league average) an additional three times, ending his career with an impressive .388 on-base percentage. Six times he drew more than 100 bases on balls, and he led his league twice. He set the American League record for having the lowest batting average while leading the league in walks in  when he posted a .211 batting average with a league-leading 110 walks. In , he had a .415 on-base percentage while posting a .233 batting average, the second lowest batting average with a .400 on-base percentage in major league history. Less than half of his career trips to first base came via base hits, reaching 1,075 times through walks (984) and being hit by pitches (91) as opposed to only 1,060 hits.

In his book, The Bill James Historical Baseball Abstract, baseball historian Bill James ranked Tenace 23rd all-time among major league catchers. Chuck Rosciam, a baseball historian and a member of the Society for American Baseball Research, believes that Tenace deserves to be enshrined in the Baseball Hall of Fame. Using six offensive measures–batting average, on-base percentage, slugging percentage, runs batted in, runs created and win shares, all league-era adjusted—Rosciam ranks Tenace sixth offensively behind Mickey Cochrane, Mike Piazza, Bill Dickey, Gabby Hartnett and Joe Torre among catchers. Among major league catchers, he is fourth overall in career on-base percentage (OBP) behind Mickey Cochrane, Wally Schang and Joe Mauer. He is tied with Johnny Bench and Joe Torre for third in career on-base plus slugging percentage (OPS) behind only Roy Campanella and Yogi Berra.

Notable achievements

 AL All-Star (1975)
 1972 World Series MVP
 2-time League Bases on Balls Leader (1974/AL & 1977/NL)
 20-Home Run Seasons: 5 (1973–1976 & 1979)
 Caught Vida Blue's no-hitter on September 21, 1970
 Won four World Series as a player with the Oakland Athletics (1972, 1973 & 1974) and the St. Louis Cardinals (1982)
 Won two World Series as a coach with the Toronto Blue Jays (1992 & 1993)

Appearances in other media
 Tenace did a voice cameo in an episode of The Simpsons entitled "Regarding Margie" in 2006.
 Tenace appeared in a television commercial for the Toronto Blue Jays in 2008.
 Tenace was mentioned by sportscaster Champ Kind in the party scene in Anchorman: The Legend of Ron Burgundy while describing his signature catchphrase. "Gene Tenace at the plate, and Whammmy!"
 Tenace is portrayed on one of the Floodwall Murals in Portsmouth, Ohio honoring local Major League Baseball players.

References

External links

Baseball Reference (Minors)
Baseball Evolution Hall of Fame
Baseball Gauge
Gene Tenace - Baseballbiography.com
Encyclopedia of Baseball Catchers
Retrosheet
Venezuelan Professional Baseball League

1946 births
Living people
American expatriate baseball people in Canada
American League All-Stars
American people of Italian descent
Arizona Instructional League Athletics players
Baseball players from Pennsylvania
Birmingham A's players
Houston Astros coaches
Iowa Oaks players
Leesburg A's players
Leones del Caracas players
American expatriate baseball players in Venezuela
Major League Baseball catchers
Major League Baseball first basemen
Major League Baseball hitting coaches
World Series Most Valuable Player Award winners
Minor league baseball managers
Oakland Athletics players
Peninsula Grays players
People from West Deer Township, Pennsylvania
Pittsburgh Pirates players
St. Louis Cardinals players
San Diego Padres players
Shelby Rebels players
Toronto Blue Jays coaches
Toronto Blue Jays managers